Gordon Allan (born 3 April 1998) is an Australian Paralympic cyclist who won a silver medal at 2019 World Para Track Championships. He competed at the 2020 Tokyo Paralympics.

Personal
Allan was born 3 April 1998. Allan was born with cerebral palsy affecting his four limbs due to a loss of oxygen at birth. He attended Patrician Brothers' College, Blacktown.  He is studying a Bachelor of Sport and Exercise Science at Western Sydney University.

Cycling
Before committing to cycling, Allan was active in athletics, swimming, and football. He represented Australia at the Football World Championship Under 19 at the 2015 CPISRA World Games.

Allan is classified as a C2 cyclist. His cycling ability was spotted at an Australian Paralympic Committee talent search day at Blacktown and he subsequently joined the Parramatta Cycling Club and commenced training at the Western Sydney Academy of Sport at Homebush. Allan took up cycling seriously in 2013. In 2016 as a 17 year old , he won the Men's Road Race and the Men's Time C2 at the Australian Championships but he was not selected for the 2016 Rio Paralympics. He won the Men's Time Trial and Men's Individual Pursuit C2 at the 2019 Para Track Cycling National Championships.

At the 2019 UCI Para-cycling Track World Championships in Apeldoorn, Netherlands, he won the silver medal in the Men's 1 km Time Trial C2. His time of 1min 12.873secs was a new world record but it was broken by the final competitor Alejandro Perea who just broke his new record by 0.005secs. (1min12.838secs).

At the 2020 UCI Para-cycling Track World Championships, Milton, Ontario, he won the bronze medal in Men's Time Trial C2.

At the 2020 Tokyo Paralympics, Allan finished fifth in the Men's time trial C1–3 and ninth together with Meg Lemon and Amanda Reid in the Mixed team sprint C1–5.

At the 2022 UCI Para-cycling Track World Championships in  Saint-Quentin-en-Yvelines, France, he won two bronze medals - Men's Time Trial C2 and Mixed Team Sprint C1-5.

References

External links

Australian Cycling Team Profile

Paralympic cyclists of Australia
Cyclists at the 2020 Summer Paralympics
1998 births
Living people
Australian male cyclists
Cerebral Palsy category Paralympic competitors